Rahimabad Du (also Romanized as Raḩīmābād Dū, meaning "Rahimabad 2"; also known as Raḩīmābād) is a village in Dowreh Rural District, Chegeni District, Dowreh County, Lorestan Province, Iran. At the 2006 census, its population was 64, in 14 families.

References 

Towns and villages in Dowreh County